Yasaqleq (also Romanized as Yāsāqleq) is a village in Zavkuh Rural District, Pishkamar District, Kalaleh County, Golestan Province, Iran. At the 2006 census, its population was 600, in 128 families.

References 

Populated places in Kalaleh County